Abduhalim Ghafforov was a presidential candidate in the 2006 Tajik presidential election, representing the Socialist Party. He is an Education Ministry official, who leads the officially registered Socialist Party of Tajikistan.

References

Socialist Party of Tajikistan politicians
Living people
Year of birth missing (living people)
Place of birth missing (living people)